Ronald de Levington Kirkbride (February 1, 1912 – March 23, 1973) was a Canadian writer of escapist romances, Westerns, and mystery novels. He was probably best known for his novel A Girl Named Tamiko, first published in 1959; it sold one million copies worldwide and a screenplay based on that novel become a 1962 film of the same name, directed by John Sturges.
 
Kirkbride wrote over two dozen other novels, including The Private Life of Guy de Maupassant, Still the Heart Sings, Winds Blow Gently, David Jordan (1972), and Some Darling Sin (1973).  His spy novel The Short Night was optioned by Alfred Hitchcock to be adapted for a film that was to follow Family Plot, but Hitchcock decided during pre-production that his poor health would prevent him from making the film.

References

External links

Canadian romantic fiction writers
Canadian mystery writers
Western (genre) writers
Writers from Victoria, British Columbia
1912 births
1973 deaths
20th-century Canadian novelists
20th-century Canadian screenwriters